Industry Giant is a business simulation game for Windows. In 2002 a sequel, Industry Giant II, was released.

Gameplay

Reception

The game received "unfavorable" reviews according to the review aggregation website Metacritic. However, Next Generation said, "Industry Giant is presented well, with polished graphics and an upbeat soundtrack. It may not have mass market appeal, but it is a solid enough game to keep sim fans salivating for a long time."

The game was a commercial blockbuster, with sales above 800,000 units in Germany.

References

External links

1997 video games
Business simulation games
JoWooD Entertainment games
Video games developed in Austria
Windows games
Windows-only games